Fuyong subdistrict (福永街道) is subdistrict on the eastern bank of the Pearl River in Bao'an District, Shenzhen, Guangdong, the People's Republic of China.

See also
 Shenzhen Bao'an International Airport
 Shenzhen Fuyong Ferry Terminal

Subdistricts of Shenzhen
Bao'an District